The 2002–03 New York Islanders season was the 31st season in the franchise's history.

Off-season

Regular season

Final standings

Playoffs
The Islanders lost in the first round to the Ottawa Senators 4-1.

Schedule and results

Regular season

|- align="center" bgcolor="#FFBBBB"
|1||L||October 10, 2002||1–5 || align="left"| @ Buffalo Sabres (2002–03) ||0–1–0–0 || 
|- align="center" bgcolor="#FFBBBB"
|2||L||October 12, 2002||1–2 || align="left"|  Washington Capitals (2002–03) ||0–2–0–0 || 
|- align="center" bgcolor="#CCFFCC"
|3||W||October 15, 2002||4–3 OT|| align="left"|  Nashville Predators (2002–03) ||1–2–0–0 || 
|- align="center"
|4||T||October 17, 2002||3–3 OT|| align="left"| @ Philadelphia Flyers (2002–03) ||1–2–1–0 || 
|- align="center" bgcolor="#CCFFCC"
|5||W||October 19, 2002||5–4 || align="left"| @ Atlanta Thrashers (2002–03) ||2–2–1–0 || 
|- align="center" bgcolor="#FFBBBB"
|6||L||October 22, 2002||1–4 || align="left"|  Carolina Hurricanes (2002–03) ||2–3–1–0 || 
|- align="center" bgcolor="#CCFFCC"
|7||W||October 24, 2002||5–3 || align="left"|  Florida Panthers (2002–03) ||3–3–1–0 || 
|- align="center" bgcolor="#FFBBBB"
|8||L||October 26, 2002||2–6 || align="left"|  Philadelphia Flyers (2002–03) ||3–4–1–0 || 
|- align="center" bgcolor="#FFBBBB"
|9||L||October 29, 2002||2–3 || align="left"|  Phoenix Coyotes (2002–03) ||3–5–1–0 || 
|- align="center" bgcolor="#FFBBBB"
|10||L||October 30, 2002||2–4 || align="left"| @ Carolina Hurricanes (2002–03) ||3–6–1–0 || 
|-

|- align="center" bgcolor="#FFBBBB"
|11||L||November 2, 2002||1–6 || align="left"|  St. Louis Blues (2002–03) ||3–7–1–0 || 
|- align="center" bgcolor="#FFBBBB"
|12||L||November 4, 2002||2–4 || align="left"|  Calgary Flames (2002–03) ||3–8–1–0 || 
|- align="center" bgcolor="#FFBBBB"
|13||L||November 7, 2002||0–3 || align="left"| @ Montreal Canadiens (2002–03) ||3–9–1–0 || 
|- align="center" bgcolor="#CCFFCC"
|14||W||November 8, 2002||4–2 || align="left"|  Edmonton Oilers (2002–03) ||4–9–1–0 || 
|- align="center" bgcolor="#CCFFCC"
|15||W||November 10, 2002||3–2 || align="left"|  Dallas Stars (2002–03) ||5–9–1–0 || 
|- align="center" bgcolor="#FFBBBB"
|16||L||November 12, 2002||3–5 || align="left"|  Ottawa Senators (2002–03) ||5–10–1–0 || 
|- align="center" bgcolor="#FFBBBB"
|17||L||November 14, 2002||1–4 || align="left"| @ Boston Bruins (2002–03) ||5–11–1–0 || 
|- align="center" bgcolor="#CCFFCC"
|18||W||November 16, 2002||3–2 || align="left"| @ Pittsburgh Penguins (2002–03) ||6–11–1–0 || 
|- align="center"
|19||T||November 20, 2002||3–3 OT|| align="left"| @ Florida Panthers (2002–03) ||6–11–2–0 || 
|- align="center" bgcolor="#CCFFCC"
|20||W||November 21, 2002||7–2 || align="left"| @ Tampa Bay Lightning (2002–03) ||7–11–2–0 || 
|- align="center" bgcolor="#CCFFCC"
|21||W||November 23, 2002||3–1 || align="left"| @ New York Rangers (2002–03) ||8–11–2–0 || 
|- align="center"
|22||T||November 27, 2002||2–2 OT|| align="left"|  Ottawa Senators (2002–03) ||8–11–3–0 || 
|- align="center" bgcolor="#FFBBBB"
|23||L||November 29, 2002||2–4 || align="left"|  Columbus Blue Jackets (2002–03) ||8–12–3–0 || 
|- align="center" bgcolor="#FFBBBB"
|24||L||November 30, 2002||2–4 || align="left"| @ Ottawa Senators (2002–03) ||8–13–3–0 || 
|-

|- align="center" bgcolor="#CCFFCC"
|25||W||December 3, 2002||2–1 || align="left"|  Vancouver Canucks (2002–03) ||9–13–3–0 || 
|- align="center" bgcolor="#CCFFCC"
|26||W||December 6, 2002||4–2 || align="left"|  Toronto Maple Leafs (2002–03) ||10–13–3–0 || 
|- align="center" bgcolor="#CCFFCC"
|27||W||December 7, 2002||6–3 || align="left"| @ Pittsburgh Penguins (2002–03) ||11–13–3–0 || 
|- align="center" bgcolor="#FFBBBB"
|28||L||December 10, 2002||2–3 || align="left"|  Chicago Blackhawks (2002–03) ||11–14–3–0 || 
|- align="center"
|29||T||December 13, 2002||3–3 OT|| align="left"| @ Florida Panthers (2002–03) ||11–14–4–0 || 
|- align="center" bgcolor="#FFBBBB"
|30||L||December 14, 2002||3–4 || align="left"| @ Tampa Bay Lightning (2002–03) ||11–15–4–0 || 
|- align="center"
|31||T||December 17, 2002||2–2 OT|| align="left"|  Detroit Red Wings (2002–03) ||11–15–5–0 || 
|- align="center" bgcolor="#CCFFCC"
|32||W||December 19, 2002||4–2 || align="left"| @ Minnesota Wild (2002–03) ||12–15–5–0 || 
|- align="center" bgcolor="#FFBBBB"
|33||L||December 21, 2002||1–3 || align="left"|  Washington Capitals (2002–03) ||12–16–5–0 || 
|- align="center" bgcolor="#CCFFCC"
|34||W||December 23, 2002||3–1 || align="left"|  Montreal Canadiens (2002–03) ||13–16–5–0 || 
|- align="center" bgcolor="#CCFFCC"
|35||W||December 28, 2002||3–0 || align="left"|  Carolina Hurricanes (2002–03) ||14–16–5–0 || 
|- align="center" bgcolor="#CCFFCC"
|36||W||December 30, 2002||2–1 OT|| align="left"|  Florida Panthers (2002–03) ||15–16–5–0 || 
|- align="center" bgcolor="#CCFFCC"
|37||W||December 31, 2002||1–0 OT|| align="left"| @ Buffalo Sabres (2002–03) ||16–16–5–0 || 
|-

|- align="center" bgcolor="#CCFFCC"
|38||W||January 3, 2003||8–4 || align="left"|  Boston Bruins (2002–03) ||17–16–5–0 || 
|- align="center" bgcolor="#FF6F6F"
|39||OTL||January 4, 2003||2–3 OT|| align="left"| @ Pittsburgh Penguins (2002–03) ||17–16–5–1 || 
|- align="center" bgcolor="#CCFFCC"
|40||W||January 7, 2003||6–3 || align="left"|  Pittsburgh Penguins (2002–03) ||18–16–5–1 || 
|- align="center" bgcolor="#FFBBBB"
|41||L||January 9, 2003||0–4 || align="left"|  Philadelphia Flyers (2002–03) ||18–17–5–1 || 
|- align="center" bgcolor="#CCFFCC"
|42||W||January 11, 2003||7–3 || align="left"|  Atlanta Thrashers (2002–03) ||19–17–5–1 || 
|- align="center" bgcolor="#FF6F6F"
|43||OTL||January 13, 2003||3–4 OT|| align="left"| @ Washington Capitals (2002–03) ||19–17–5–2 || 
|- align="center" bgcolor="#FFBBBB"
|44||L||January 15, 2003||0–5 || align="left"| @ New Jersey Devils (2002–03) ||19–18–5–2 || 
|- align="center" bgcolor="#CCFFCC"
|45||W||January 16, 2003||3–2 OT|| align="left"| @ St. Louis Blues (2002–03) ||20–18–5–2 || 
|- align="center" bgcolor="#CCFFCC"
|46||W||January 19, 2003||4–1 || align="left"| @ Atlanta Thrashers (2002–03) ||21–18–5–2 || 
|- align="center" bgcolor="#FFBBBB"
|47||L||January 21, 2003||0–5 || align="left"|  New York Rangers (2002–03) ||21–19–5–2 || 
|- align="center" bgcolor="#CCFFCC"
|48||W||January 24, 2003||3–1 || align="left"| @ Philadelphia Flyers (2002–03) ||22–19–5–2 || 
|- align="center" bgcolor="#FFBBBB"
|49||L||January 25, 2003||1–4 || align="left"| @ Columbus Blue Jackets (2002–03) ||22–20–5–2 || 
|- align="center" bgcolor="#CCFFCC"
|50||W||January 28, 2003||5–2 || align="left"|  Pittsburgh Penguins (2002–03) ||23–20–5–2 || 
|- align="center" bgcolor="#CCFFCC"
|51||W||January 30, 2003||3–1 || align="left"|  Montreal Canadiens (2002–03) ||24–20–5–2 || 
|-

|- align="center" bgcolor="#FFBBBB"
|52||L||February 4, 2003||1–2 || align="left"|  Philadelphia Flyers (2002–03) ||24–21–5–2 || 
|- align="center" bgcolor="#FFBBBB"
|53||L||February 7, 2003||0–3 || align="left"| @ Washington Capitals (2002–03) ||24–22–5–2 || 
|- align="center" bgcolor="#CCFFCC"
|54||W||February 8, 2003||3–1 || align="left"|  Buffalo Sabres (2002–03) ||25–22–5–2 || 
|- align="center" bgcolor="#CCFFCC"
|55||W||February 11, 2003||6–2 || align="left"|  Tampa Bay Lightning (2002–03) ||26–22–5–2 || 
|- align="center" bgcolor="#FFBBBB"
|56||L||February 13, 2003||0–2 || align="left"| @ Nashville Predators (2002–03) ||26–23–5–2 || 
|- align="center" bgcolor="#CCFFCC"
|57||W||February 15, 2003||3–2 || align="left"| @ Los Angeles Kings (2002–03) ||27–23–5–2 || 
|- align="center"
|58||T||February 17, 2003||2–2 OT|| align="left"| @ Mighty Ducks of Anaheim (2002–03) ||27–23–6–2 || 
|- align="center" bgcolor="#CCFFCC"
|59||W||February 19, 2003||3–0 || align="left"| @ San Jose Sharks (2002–03) ||28–23–6–2 || 
|- align="center" bgcolor="#CCFFCC"
|60||W||February 21, 2003||4–1 || align="left"|  Colorado Avalanche (2002–03) ||29–23–6–2 || 
|- align="center"
|61||T||February 23, 2003||4–4 OT|| align="left"|  Boston Bruins (2002–03) ||29–23–7–2 || 
|- align="center" bgcolor="#FFBBBB"
|62||L||February 25, 2003||2–5 || align="left"| @ Toronto Maple Leafs (2002–03) ||29–24–7–2 || 
|- align="center"
|63||T||February 27, 2003||3–3 OT|| align="left"|  New Jersey Devils (2002–03) ||29–24–8–2 || 
|-

|- align="center" bgcolor="#CCFFCC"
|64||W||March 1, 2003||2–1 OT|| align="left"|  Buffalo Sabres (2002–03) ||30–24–8–2 || 
|- align="center"
|65||T||March 3, 2003||1–1 OT|| align="left"| @ New York Rangers (2002–03) ||30–24–9–2 || 
|- align="center" bgcolor="#FFBBBB"
|66||L||March 4, 2003||1–3 || align="left"|  Tampa Bay Lightning (2002–03) ||30–25–9–2 || 
|- align="center" bgcolor="#FFBBBB"
|67||L||March 6, 2003||1–4 || align="left"| @ Boston Bruins (2002–03) ||30–26–9–2 || 
|- align="center" bgcolor="#FFBBBB"
|68||L||March 8, 2003||2–4 || align="left"|  New Jersey Devils (2002–03) ||30–27–9–2 || 
|- align="center" bgcolor="#FFBBBB"
|69||L||March 11, 2003||3–4 || align="left"| @ Vancouver Canucks (2002–03) ||30–28–9–2 || 
|- align="center" bgcolor="#CCFFCC"
|70||W||March 13, 2003||5–2 || align="left"| @ Edmonton Oilers (2002–03) ||31–28–9–2 || 
|- align="center" bgcolor="#CCFFCC"
|71||W||March 15, 2003||5–2 || align="left"| @ Ottawa Senators (2002–03) ||32–28–9–2 || 
|- align="center" bgcolor="#FFBBBB"
|72||L||March 17, 2003||0–1 || align="left"| @ New York Rangers (2002–03) ||32–29–9–2 || 
|- align="center"
|73||T||March 18, 2003||3–3 OT|| align="left"| @ Toronto Maple Leafs (2002–03) ||32–29–10–2 || 
|- align="center" bgcolor="#CCFFCC"
|74||W||March 20, 2003||6–3 || align="left"| @ Montreal Canadiens (2002–03) ||33–29–10–2 || 
|- align="center" bgcolor="#FFBBBB"
|75||L||March 22, 2003||2–4 || align="left"|  New Jersey Devils (2002–03) ||33–30–10–2 || 
|- align="center" bgcolor="#CCFFCC"
|76||W||March 25, 2003||9–2 || align="left"| @ Chicago Blackhawks (2002–03) ||34–30–10–2 || 
|- align="center" bgcolor="#FFBBBB"
|77||L||March 28, 2003||2–5 || align="left"|  Toronto Maple Leafs (2002–03) ||34–31–10–2 || 
|- align="center" bgcolor="#FFBBBB"
|78||L||March 30, 2003||0–6 || align="left"| @ New Jersey Devils (2002–03) ||34–32–10–2 || 
|-

|- align="center"
|79||T||April 1, 2003||2–2 OT|| align="left"|  New York Rangers (2002–03) ||34–32–11–2 || 
|- align="center" bgcolor="#FFBBBB"
|80||L||April 3, 2003||2–5 || align="left"| @ Detroit Red Wings (2002–03) ||34–33–11–2 || 
|- align="center" bgcolor="#FFBBBB"
|81||L||April 5, 2003||2–3 || align="left"|  Atlanta Thrashers (2002–03) ||34–34–11–2 || 
|- align="center" bgcolor="#CCFFCC"
|82||W||April 6, 2003||2–1 || align="left"| @ Carolina Hurricanes (2002–03) ||35–34–11–2 || 
|-

|-
| Legend:

Playoffs

|- align="center" bgcolor="#CCFFCC"
| 1 ||W|| April 9, 2003 || @ Ottawa Senators || 3–0 || Islanders lead 1–0 || 
|- align="center" bgcolor="#FFBBBB"
| 2 ||L|| April 12, 2003 || @ Ottawa Senators || 0–3 || Series tied 1–1 || 
|- align="center" bgcolor="#FFBBBB"
| 3 ||L|| April 14, 2003 || Ottawa Senators || 2–3 2OT || Senators lead 2–1 || 
|- align="center" bgcolor="#FFBBBB"
| 4 ||L|| April 16, 2003 || Ottawa Senators || 1–3 || Senators lead 3–1 || 
|- align="center" bgcolor="#FFBBBB"
| 5 ||L|| April 17, 2003 || @ Ottawa Senators || 1–4 || Senators win 4–1 || 
|-

|-
| Legend:

Player statistics

Scoring
 Position abbreviations: C = Center; D = Defense; G = Goaltender; LW = Left Wing; RW = Right Wing
  = Joined team via a transaction (e.g., trade, waivers, signing) during the season. Stats reflect time with the Islanders only.
  = Left team via a transaction (e.g., trade, waivers, release) during the season. Stats reflect time with the Islanders only.

Goaltending
  = Left team via a transaction (e.g., trade, waivers, release) during the season. Stats reflect time with the Islanders only.

Awards and records

Awards

Transactions
The Islanders were involved in the following transactions from June 14, 2002, the day after the deciding game of the 2002 Stanley Cup Finals, through June 9, 2003, the day of the deciding game of the 2003 Stanley Cup Finals.

Trades

Players acquired

Players lost

Signings

Draft picks
New York's draft picks at the 2002 NHL Entry Draft held at the Air Canada Centre in Toronto, Ontario.

See also
 2002–03 NHL season

Notes

References

New York Islanders seasons
New York Islanders
New York Islanders
New York Islanders
New York Islanders